Lucie Höflich (born Helene Lucie von Holwede; 20 February 1883 – 9 October 1956) was a German actress, teacher and head of the Staatliche Schauspielschule (State Drama School) in Berlin. In 1937 she was named the Staats-Schauspielerin (State Actress) and in 1953 she was awarded the Bundesverdienstkreuz.

Stage appearances

Lucie Höflich was born in Hanover and debuted at the age of 16 at the Bromberg City Theater and in 1901 moved to the Intime Theater von Nürnberg, and then to the Raimund-Theater in Vienna. In 1903 Max Reinhardt recruited her to the Deutsches Theater in Berlin where she performed until 1932.

She died in Berlin in 1956, aged 73.

Selected filmography
Among the films she acted in were Maria Magdalene in 1929, Die Straße in 1923, Tartüff in 1925, the 1936 The Abduction of the Sabine Women, the Nazi Propaganda Film Ohm Krüger in 1941, with her last being the 1956 The Story of Anastasia.
 Mary Magdalene (1920) as Klara
 Catherine the Great (1920) as Catherine the Great
 The Rats (1921) as Mrs. John
 Seafaring Is Necessary (1921)
 The Inheritance of Tordis (1921) as Anna Kathrins's mother
 A Glass of Water (1923) as the Duchess of Marlborough
 The Lost Shoe (1923) as Countess Benrat
 The Street (1923) as the wife of the petty bourgeois man
 Nora (1923) as Mrs. Linden
 Kaddish (1924)
 The Secret Agent (1924) as the Duchess's mother
 A Waltz Dream (1925)
 Goetz von Berlichingen of the Iron Hand (1925)
 The House of Lies (1926) as Gina
 Only a Dancing Girl (1926) as Mrs. Radinger
 The Beaver Coat (1928) as Mrs. Wolff
 Life's Circus (1928) as the wife
 1914 (1931) as the Czarina
 The White Demon (1932) as Gildemeister's Mother
 The Golden Anchor (1932)  as Honorine
 The Burning Secret (1933) as the wife's mother
 Peer Gynt (1934) as Mother Aase
 Family Parade (1936) as Mrs. Applequist
 The Czar's Courier (1936) as Marfa Strogoff
 The Abduction of the Sabine Women (1936) as Rosa
 The Citadel of Warsaw (1937) as Frau Welgorska
 Robert Koch (1939) as Mrs. Paul
 We Danced Around the World (1939) as Jenny Hill
 The Fox of Glenarvon (1940) as Baroness Margit O'Connor
 Ohm Krüger (1941) as Sanna Krüger
 Das Grosse Spiel (1942) as Mrs. Klebuch
 Sky Without Stars (1955) as Mother Mathilde Kaminski
 The Story of Anastasia (1956) as Mrs. Bäumle

References

External links

Lucie Höflich filmography from www.filmportal.de
Lucie Höflich. Photographs from virtual history

1883 births
1956 deaths
Actors from Hanover
People from the Province of Hanover
German film actresses
German silent film actresses
German stage actresses
Officers Crosses of the Order of Merit of the Federal Republic of Germany
19th-century German actresses
20th-century German actresses